Sayed Borhan Khan (1624 – c. 1680) was a khan of Qasim Khanate from 1627 to 1679. He was a son of Arslanghali and Fatima Soltan. After the death of his father he was crowned as a khan of Qasim. Sayed Borhan's regents were Fatima Soltan and her father Agha Muhammad Shah Quli Sayyid. During his reign the Khanate was totally placed under Moscow control, Russian authorities enforced Christianization. In 1679 Sayed Borhan abdicated and was baptized as Vasili.

References

Qasim Khanate
Converts to Eastern Orthodoxy from Islam
1624 births
1680 deaths
17th-century monarchs in Europe
Russian former Muslims
Tatar Christians